The 1992 South African Grand Prix was a Formula One motor race held at the Kyalami circuit in Midrand, South Africa on 1 March 1992. It was the opening round of the 1992 Formula One World Championship and was contested over 72 laps. It was the 32nd South African Grand Prix, and the 22nd as part of the World Championship. Nigel Mansell dominated the weekend in his Williams-Renault, taking pole position, fastest lap and leading every lap of the race en route to victory for the second time in his career. Mansell's teammate, Riccardo Patrese, asserted the dominance of the car by completing a 1–2 finish. Ayrton Senna completed the podium for the McLaren team.

This was the first post-apartheid South African Grand Prix, the last running of the race having been in 1985 during Premier P. W. Botha's state of emergency. It was held on a revised Kyalami circuit, which used only a small part of the old layout.

Pre-race
As the revised Kyalami circuit was new to the Formula One calendar, there were two acclimatisation sessions held on the Thursday before the Grand Prix weekend. A pre-qualifying session was to be held on Friday morning to eliminate two cars, allowing the other 30 to take part in the main qualifying sessions on Friday afternoon and Saturday.

The entrants required to take part in pre-qualifying included the Larrousse team with their new Venturi LC92 chassis, driven by Bertrand Gachot, who had driven for the team in the season-ending 1991 Australian Grand Prix after losing his seat at Jordan; and the reigning Japanese Formula 3000 champion Ukyo Katayama. Also due to take part were one car from each of the Fondmetal and Footwork teams. They had chosen Swiss debutant Andrea Chiesa and Italian veteran Michele Alboreto respectively. The other two cars taking part were from the new Andrea Moda team.

The Andrea Moda fashion company, owned by Andrea Sassetti, had bought the Coloni team, which had failed to pre-qualify at every race of the 1991 season. They had signed ex-Footwork driver Alex Caffi, and Enrico Bertaggia, who had driven for Coloni during the 1989 season, and had brought the Judd-engined Andrea Moda C4B to South Africa. This car was an adaptation of last season's Cosworth-powered Coloni C4. Caffi drove in the second of Thursday's acclimatisation sessions, although the car's battery failed on the first lap. Bertaggia did not run, and it was unclear if a second C4B had been built, or brought to Kyalami. However, a Stewards' Meeting on Thursday afternoon ruled that Andrea Moda was a new team, not a continuation of Coloni, and were therefore liable to pay a $100,000 guarantee according to Article 41 of the Formula One Sporting Regulations. The stewards also noted that the C4 cars were originally built, and had been raced, by another constructor, i.e. Coloni, not Andrea Moda, thus the cars were likely to be ineligible, as a new team must use an original chassis. In any case, failure to pay the guarantee meant exclusion from the event.

Sassetti believed that he did not have to pay the guarantee for new teams as he had purchased an existing team, but officials decided that he had not purchased Coloni's entry into Formula One, or the constructor itself, only its cars and facilities. Sassetti lodged an appeal, citing the fact that several other teams, such as March, Fondmetal and Footwork had not been required to pay the guarantee when the teams changed hands. In any case, Andrea Moda's exclusion meant that pre-qualifying was cancelled.

Qualifying

Qualifying report
Mansell took pole position by almost three-quarters of a second from Senna, and set a lap time over 1.5 seconds faster than his teammate Patrese. Nevertheless, Berger also managed to set a time quicker than that of Patrese's meaning he started the race from third position, and the Italian in fourth. Jean Alesi's Ferrari was the only other car capable of staying within two seconds of Mansell, as the Frenchman secured a fifth place grid slot on the same row as Michael Schumacher in his Benetton. Karl Wendlinger did well to position his March up in seventh place, while his new teammate Paul Belmondo failed to qualify. Wendlinger was ahead of Schumacher's teammate Martin Brundle, who had qualified eighth, and the other Ferrari of Ivan Capelli, who was ninth. Andrea de Cesaris completed the top ten in his Tyrrell in a time over three seconds behind Mansell's. Stefano Modena failed to qualify his Jordan-Yamaha, partly because of problems with the reliability of the Yamaha engine which, according to then BBC commentator Murray Walker, was grenading itself.

Qualifying classification

Race

Race report
The race was fairly uneventful as Mansell led from lights to flag, finishing nearly 25 seconds ahead of Patrese. Martin Brundle spun off on the first lap but was able to continue until his clutch failed as a result of the spin and was forced into retirement when he pulled into the pits. Senna drove well to ensure he remained on the podium with a 1991 car, as did Schumacher, who gained from his qualifying position to complete the race in fourth place after Jean Alesi had retired with engine failure on lap 41 who was behind Senna and ahead of Schumacher. Berger finished in fifth place and nearly 40 seconds behind his teammate; he was the last driver to finish the race on the lead lap. Johnny Herbert finished in sixth place and took the final point for Lotus after the Tyrrell of Andrea de Cesaris like Alesi had retired when his Ilmor engine failed on lap 42.  Interestingly, all of the top 6 finishers drove cars that were either evolutions of (or direct carryovers) of cars designed for previous seasons.

Race classification

Championship standings after the race

Drivers' Championship standings

Constructors' Championship standings

References

South African Grand Prix
South African Grand Prix
Grand Prix
March 1992 sports events in Africa